LX Cycling Team is a South Korean UCI Continental road cycling team founded in 2016.

Team roster

Major wins
2016
Stage 1 International Tour de Banyuwangi Ijen, Dong Hyun Shin

2019
Stage 2 The Princess Maha Chakri Sirindhorn's Cup, Park Sang-hoon

References

External links

Cycling teams based in South Korea